Arrival is an album by Horace Parlan featuring performances recorded in 1973 and released on the SteepleChase label. It was Parlan's first album for the label and his first recording as a leader for a decade following the end of his association with the Blue Note label.

Track listing
All compositions by Horace Parlan except as indicated
 "Arrival"5:47
 "For Heaven's Sake" (Elise Bretton, Sherman Edwards, Donald Meyer)4:41
 "Norma"5:15
 "New Start" (Idrees Sulieman)7:31
 "Saucer Eyes" (Randy Weston)5:54 
 "Polka Dots and Moonbeams" (Johnny Burke, Jimmy Van Heusen)4:35
 "Waltz, No. 1"4:25
 "Back from the Gig"4:18
 "Bags' Groove" (Milt Jackson)3:34
 "Just Keep A-Walkin'" (Thad Jones)8:19

Personnel
Horace Parlanpiano
Idrees Suliemanflugelhorn
Bent Jædigtenor saxophone
Hugo Rasmussenbass
Ed Thigpendrums

References

SteepleChase Records albums
Horace Parlan albums
1974 albums